A reaction wheel (RW) is used primarily by spacecraft for three-axis attitude control, and does not require rockets or external applicators of torque. They provide a high pointing accuracy, and are particularly useful when the spacecraft must be rotated by very small amounts, such as keeping a telescope pointed at a star.

A reaction wheel is sometimes operated as (and referred to as) a momentum wheel, by operating it at a constant (or near-constant) rotation speed, to provide a satellite with a large amount of stored angular momentum. Doing so alters the spacecraft's rotational dynamics so that disturbance torques perpendicular to one axis of the satellite (the axis parallel to the wheel's spin axis) do not result directly in spacecraft angular motion about the same axis as the disturbance torque; instead, they result in (generally smaller) angular motion (precession) of that spacecraft axis about a perpendicular axis. This has the effect of tending to stabilize that spacecraft axis to point in a nearly-fixed direction, allowing for a less-complicated attitude control system. Satellites using this "momentum-bias" stabilization approach include SCISAT-1; by orienting the momentum wheel's axis to be parallel to the orbit-normal vector, this satellite is in a "pitch momentum bias" configuration.

A control moment gyroscope (CMG) is a related but different type of attitude actuator, generally consisting of a momentum wheel mounted in a one-axis or two-axis gimbal. When mounted to a rigid spacecraft, applying a constant torque to the wheel using one of the gimbal motors causes the spacecraft to develop a constant angular velocity about a perpendicular axis, thus allowing control of the spacecraft's pointing direction. CMGs are generally able to produce larger sustained torques than RWs with less motor heating, and are preferentially used in larger or more-agile (or both) spacecraft, including Skylab, Mir, and the International Space Station.

Theory
Reaction wheels are used to control the attitude of a satellite without the use of thrusters, which reduces the mass fraction needed for fuel.

They work by equipping the spacecraft with an electric motor attached to a flywheel, which, when its rotation speed is changed, causes the spacecraft to begin to counter-rotate proportionately through conservation of angular momentum. Reaction wheels can rotate a spacecraft only around its center of mass (see torque); they are not capable of moving the spacecraft from one place to another (see translational force).

Implementation 
For three-axis control, reaction wheels must be mounted along at least three directions, with extra wheels providing redundancy to the attitude control system. A redundant mounting configuration could consist of four wheels along tetrahedral axes, or a spare wheel carried in addition to a three axis configuration. Changes in speed (in either direction) are controlled electronically by computer. The strength of the materials used in a reaction wheel determine the speed at which the wheel would come apart, and therefore how much angular momentum it can store.

Since the reaction wheel is a small fraction of the spacecraft's total mass, easily controlled, temporary changes in its speed result in small changes in angle. The wheels therefore permit very precise changes in a spacecraft's attitude. For this reason, reaction wheels are often used to aim spacecraft carrying cameras or telescopes.

Over time, reaction wheels may build up enough stored momentum to exceed the maximum speed of the wheel, called saturation, which will need to be canceled. Designers therefore supplement reaction wheel systems with other attitude control mechanisms. In the presence of a magnetic field (as in low Earth orbit), a spacecraft can employ magnetorquers (better known as torque rods) to transfer angular momentum to Earth through its planetary magnetic field. In the absence of a magnetic field, the most efficient practice is to use either high-efficiency attitude jets such as ion thrusters, or small, lightweight solar sails placed in locations away from the spacecraft's center of mass, such as on solar cell arrays or projecting masts.

Examples of spacecraft using reaction wheels

Beresheet
Beresheet was launched on a Falcon 9 rocket on 22 February 2019 1:45 UTC, with the goal of landing on the moon. Beresheet uses the low-energy transfer technique to save fuel. Since its fourth maneuver in its elliptical orbit, to prevent shakes when the amount of liquid fuel ran low, there was a need to use a reaction wheel.

James Webb Space Telescope 
The James Webb Space Telescope has six reaction wheels built by Rockwell Collins Deutschland.

LightSail 2
LightSail 2 was launched on 25 June 2019, focused around the concept of a solar sail. LightSail 2 uses a reaction wheel system to change orientation by very small amounts, allowing it to receive different amounts of momentum from the light across the sail, resulting in a higher altitude.

Failures and mission impact 
The failure of one or more reaction wheels can cause a spacecraft to lose its ability to maintain attitude (orientation) and thus potentially cause a mission failure. Recent studies conclude that these failures can be correlated with space weather effects. These events probably caused failures by inducing electrostatic discharge in the steel ball bearings of Ithaco wheels, compromising the smoothness of the mechanism.

Hubble 
Two servicing missions to the Hubble Space Telescope have replaced a reaction wheel. In February 1997, the Second Servicing Mission (STS-82) replaced one after 'electrical anomalies', rather than any mechanical problem. Study of the returned mechanism provided a rare opportunity to study equipment that had undergone long-term service (seven years) in space, particularly for the effects of vacuum on lubricants. The lubricating compound was found to be in 'excellent condition'. In 2002, during Servicing Mission 3B (STS-109), astronauts from the shuttle Columbia replaced another reaction wheel. Neither of these wheels had failed and Hubble was designed with four redundant wheels, and maintained pointing ability so long as three were functional.

Hayabusa 
In 2004, during the mission of the Hayabusa spacecraft, an X-axis reaction wheel failed. The Y-axis wheel failed in 2005, causing the craft to rely on chemical thrusters to maintain attitude control.

Kepler 
From July 2012 to May 11, 2013, two out of the four reaction wheels in the Kepler telescope failed. This loss severely affected Kepler ability to maintain a sufficiently precise orientation to continue its original mission. On August 15, 2013, engineers concluded that Kepler'''s reaction wheels cannot be recovered and that planet-searching using the transit method (measuring changes in star brightness caused by orbiting planets) could not continue. Although the failed reaction wheels still function, they are experiencing friction exceeding acceptable levels, and consequently hindering the ability of the telescope to properly orient itself. The Kepler telescope was returned to its "point rest state", a stable configuration that uses small amounts of thruster fuel to compensate for the failed reaction wheels, while the Kepler team considered alternative uses for Kepler that do not require the extreme accuracy in its orientation needed by the original mission. On May 16, 2014, NASA extended the Kepler mission to a new mission named K2, which uses Kepler'' differently, but allows it to continue searching for exoplanets. On October 30, 2018, NASA announced the end of the Kepler mission after it was determined that the fuel supply had been exhausted.

Dawn 
The NASA space probe Dawn had excess friction in one reaction wheel in June 2010. It was originally scheduled to depart Vesta and begin its two-and-a-half-year journey to Ceres on August 26, 2012; however, a problem with another of the spacecraft's reaction wheels forced Dawn to briefly delay its departure from Vesta's gravity until September 5, 2012, and it planned to use thruster jets instead of the reaction wheels during the three-year journey  to Ceres. The loss of the reaction wheels limited the camera observations on the approach to Ceres.

Swift Observatory 

On the evening of Tuesday, January 18, 2022, a possible failure of one of Swift Observatory's reaction wheels caused the mission control team to power off the suspected wheel, putting the observatory in safe mode as a precaution. This is the first time a reaction wheel has experienced a failure in Swift's 17 years of operations.

See also
 Collins Aerospace, the owner of Ithaco Space Systems, Inc., the builder of the ill-fated reaction wheels for (among others) the Kepler, Dawn, and Hayabusa spacecraft
 Control moment gyroscope
 Reaction control system
 ROSAT, a satellite lost when limitations in its control envelope were exceeded
 Spacecraft propulsion

References

External links 

 
 
 

Spacecraft attitude control
Spacecraft propulsion
Gyroscopes

ca:Roda de reacció